Uppal Assembly constituency is a constituency of Telangana Legislative Assembly, India. It is one of 14 constituencies in Ranga Reddy diiwuudhs part of Malkajgiri Lok Sabha constituency. It is also one of the 24 constituencies of GHMC.

NVSS Prabhakar of Bharatiya Janata Party won the seat in 2014 Telangana Assembly election. Bethi Subhas Reddy of TRS was elected as MLA of the constituency in 2018.

Overview
The Assembly Constituency presently comprises the following localities.

Members of Legislative Assembly

Election results

2018

2014

2009

See also
 Uppal
 List of constituencies of Telangana Legislative Assembly

References

Assembly constituencies of Telangana
Ranga Reddy district